Michael Robertson is an Australian film director and producer.

Select credits
The Reef: Stalked (2022) – Producer, Second Unit Director
Great White (2021) – Producer
Black Water: Abyss (2020) – Producer
The Pack (2015) – Producer
Inner Demon (2014) – Executive Producer
Road Train (2010) – Producer
The Reef (2010) – Producer
Black Water (2007) – Producer
Back of Beyond (1995) – Director
Going Sane (1985) – Director
The Best of Friends (1982) – Director

External links

Prodigy Movies website – Michael Robertson's company

Australian film producers
Living people
Year of birth missing (living people)